The 1947–48 season was Arsenal's 29th consecutive season in the top division of English football. Having avoided relegation the previous season, Arsenal returned to their winning ways of the 1930s by storming to the league title seven points ahead of title rivals Manchester United and Burnley, winning it with a 1–1 draw at Huddersfield Town, and after discovering that United and Burnley had lost via the newspapers at Doncaster Station on the journey, knew that they had won the league, with Tom Whittaker the triumphant manager in his debut season at the helm, but was unable to lift the FA Cup, with the Gunners going out to lower-league Bradford Park Avenue in the third round. 
Over the course of the season Arsenal claimed some big wins, beating Charlton Athletic and Middlesbrough 6-0 and 7-0 respectively, and hammering bottom club Grimsby Town 8–0 on the final day, with Ronnie Rooke netting four times to bring his final tally for the league season to 33 in 42 Division 1 matches, thus becoming the second Arsenal player-after Ted Drake in 1934–35 to top score in the entire league.

Results
Arsenal's score comes first

Legend

Football League First Division

Final League table

FA Cup

Arsenal entered the FA Cup in the third round, in which they were drawn to face Bradford Park Avenue.

See also

 1947–48 in English football
 List of Arsenal F.C. seasons

References

English football clubs 1947–48 season
1947-48
1947-48